Meligethes atratus is a species of pollen beetle in the family Nitidulidae. It is found in Europe and Northern Asia (excluding China).

References

Further reading

External links

 

Nitidulidae
Articles created by Qbugbot
Beetles described in 1790